The 2022 ASEAN Club Championship (simply 2022 ACC) will be the third edition of the ASEAN Club Championship, an international association football competition between domestic champion clubs sides affiliated with the member associations of the ASEAN Football Federation. It is the first ACC to commence since 2005.

Twelve clubs will feature in the competition proper. The final prize money for the winners will be about US$500,000.

The tournament was initially scheduled to take place in 2020 but was postponed due to the COVID-19 pandemic. The tournament was later postponed again to 2022 due to rescheduling competitions in 2021; 2022 Asian World Cup qualification, 2023 AFC Asian Cup qualification, AFC competitions and the 2020 AFF Championship. The tournament was officially cancelled due to the ongoing pandemic.

Association team allocation
Clubs from the following 11 football associations are eligible to enter the competition:

Teams
The following 12 teams from 9 associations confirmed their participation in the competition. Malaysia had direct two berths to the group stage but is strongly considering not to enter a team. Reportedly only the first and second-placed teams in the first-tier domestic league and the winners of the national cup is eligible to enter. However Brunei's Indera only placed fourth in the 2018–19 Brunei Super League but they are Brunei's representative at the 2020 AFC Cup being the only club in the league which fulfills the AFC Club License requirements. Timor Leste also has not confirmed its participation.

Foreign players
A maximum of four foreigners are allowed per club which follows the Asian Football Confederation's (AFC) '3+1 rule'; three players of any nationality and a fourth coming from an AFC member nation. A player coming from an AFF member nation will not be considered as a foreign player.

See also
AFF Championship

References

External links
ASEAN Club Championship 2020 at Fox Sports Asia

ASEAN Club Championship
ASEAN Club Championship